Brian Philip Maher (born 1 November 2000) is an Irish footballer who plays as a goalkeeper for League of Ireland Premier Division club Derry City. He previously played for St Patrick's Athletic and Bray Wanderers.

Early life
Maher was born in Dublin in 2000 and played for local clubs Raheny United and St Kevin's Boys in Dublin at underage level before signing for St Patrick's Athletic in 2016.

Club career
Maher joined St Patrick's Athletic's under-17 side in 2016 and signed his first contract for the club in 2018, although never made a senior league appearance for the club and left to join Bray Wanderers in 2020, initially as a loan move, but then made permanent later that year. Maher made his debut for Bray in a 4–2 loss to Cabinteely. Maher went on to make 19 total appearances for Bray that season, helping them to a second-place finish. The next season Maher would become a regular for Bray and he would make 29 appearances in the 2021 First Division season.

In 2022 Maher signed for League of Ireland Premier Division side Derry City. Itbwould go on to be a very successful season for Derry and Maher as they would finish second in the table and win the FAI Cup for the first time in 10 years. Maher would even be shortlisted for Soccer Writers Ireland Goalkeeper of the Year award.

International career
Maher has been a regular for the Republic of Ireland at underage level since he first played for the U17, and has since went on to play for the country at U19 and U21 level.

Career statistics

References

External links

2000 births
Living people
Republic of Ireland association footballers
Association football goalkeepers
Association footballers from Dublin (city)
Derry City F.C. players
St Patrick's Athletic F.C. players
League of Ireland players